Alton "Dee" McCann (born April 24, 1983) is a former professional gridiron football cornerback. He was drafted by the Detroit Lions in the sixth round of the 2006 NFL Draft, but also played for the Minnesota Vikings. He played college football for the West Virginia Mountaineers. McCann has also been a member of the Calgary Stampeders.

Early years
McCann attended Greene County High School in Leakesville, Mississippi and was a student and a letterman in football. In football, he was an All-District selection as a running back.

College career
Before attending West Virginia University, he attended Jones County Junior College in Ellisville, Mississippi. McCann tallied up 72 tackles, five sacks, and three interceptions in 2003 at Jones, where he earned all-state and all-JUCO honors.

McCann transferred to WVU in 2004, where he played cornerback throughout the season with All-American Pacman Jones. McCann only recorded 21 tackles for the season, but saw his first significant action against Virginia Tech, where he recorded two tackles against the Virginia Tech Hokies. With Pacman Jones out due to injury against Rutgers, McCann started. Against the Scarlet Knights, McCann recorded an interception, fumble recovery, two forced fumbles, and eight tackles. In the Gator Bowl against the Florida State Seminoles, McCann grabbed two interceptions and recorded six tackles.

In his senior year of 2005, McCann finally took starting positions with Pacman Jones leaving for the pro draft. McCann ended the season ranked third on the Mountaineers with 64 tackles, two interceptions, and five pass break-ups. Along with safeties Mike Lorello and Jahmile Addae, McCann and the Mountaineers posted an 11-1 record after the 2006 Sugar Bowl win against the Georgia Bulldogs. McCann had an important fumble recovery in the first quarter of the 38-35 win.

Professional career

Detroit Lions
Dee McCann was drafted 179th overall in the sixth round by the Detroit Lions. McCann stayed on their roster until September 2, 2006, when he was released to the practice squad.

Minnesota Vikings
In the 2007 Minnesota Vikings preseason, against the Cleveland Browns, McCann record his first stats of his pre-season career: two tackles. On January 6, 2008 following the end of the regular season, McCann was signed to a contract from the practice squad, but was soon released afterwards.

Calgary Stampeders
McCann signed with the Calgary Stampeders on May 12, 2009. He was released on June 23, 2009.

External links
Calgary Stampeders bio
Detroit Lions bio

1983 births
Living people
People from Lucedale, Mississippi
American football cornerbacks
Canadian football defensive backs
American players of Canadian football
Jones County Bobcats football players
West Virginia Mountaineers football players
Detroit Lions players
Minnesota Vikings players
Calgary Stampeders players